The women's 100 metres hurdles at the 2010 African Championships in Athletics were held on July 28–29.

Medalists

Results

Heats
Qualification: First 3 of each heat (Q) and the next 2 fastest (q) qualified for the final.

Final
Wind: +0.20 m/s

External links
Results

100
Sprint hurdles at the African Championships in Athletics
2010 in women's athletics